The Roman Catholic Diocese of Kamina is a diocese located in the city of Kamina  in the Ecclesiastical province of Lubumbashi in the Democratic Republic of the Congo.

History
 July 18, 1922: Established as Apostolic Prefecture of Lulua and Central Katanga from the Apostolic Vicariate of Upper Kasai and Apostolic Prefecture of Katanga
 February 26, 1934: Promoted as Apostolic Vicariate of Lulua and Central Katanga
 July 8, 1948: Renamed as Apostolic Vicariate of Lulua 
 November 10, 1959: Promoted as Diocese of Kamina

Leadership
Bishops of Kamina 
 Bishop Jean-Anatole Kalala Kaseba (1990.01.22 – 2020.12.03)
 Bishop Barthélémy Malunga (1971.03.11 – 1990.01.22)
 Bishop Victor Petrus Keuppens, O.F.M. (1959.11.10 – 1971.03.11)
 Vicars Apostolic of Lulua
 Bishop Victor Petrus Keuppens, O.F.M. (1950.06.25 – 1959.11.10)
 Bishop Camillo Paolo A. Stappers, O.F.M. (1934.02.26 – 1949)
Prefect Apostolic of Lulua and Central Katanga
 Father Camillo Paolo A. Stappers, O.F.M. (1922 – 1934.02.26)

Auxiliaries
Barthélémy Malunga (1969-1971)

See also
Roman Catholicism in the Democratic Republic of the Congo

Sources
 GCatholic.org
 Catholic Hierarchy

Kamina
Roman Catholic dioceses in the Democratic Republic of the Congo
Christian organizations established in 1922
Katanga Province
Roman Catholic dioceses and prelatures established in the 20th century
Roman Catholic Ecclesiastical Province of Lubumbashi